This is a list of the Sites of Special Scientific Interest (SSSIs) in Devon, England, United Kingdom. Natural England formerly English Nature is responsible for designating SSSIs in England, and chooses sites because of their fauna, flora, geological or physiographical features. , there are 211 sites designated in this Area of Search. 71 of the sites are designated for their geological interest, 109 for biological interest and 31 are of interest for both. Eleven of Devon's SSSIs are national nature reserves, sixteen are managed by the Devon Wildlife Trust and three are bird sanctuaries. There are 49 Special Areas of Conservation.

For other counties, see List of SSSIs by Area of Search.

Sites

References

External links

 Natural England County Level Reports and Statistics

 
Devon
Sites of Special Scientific Interest